Benjamín Boza (1846 - 1921) was a Peruvian politician in the early 20th century. Boza served as the President of the Senate from 1899 to 1900. 
He was the mayor of Lima from 1900 to 1901.

References

Presidents of the Senate of Peru
Mayors of Lima
1846 births
1921 deaths